Ter Apelkanaal (Gronings: Troapelknoal ) is a town in the Dutch province of Groningen.

The city of Groningen decided to dig a canal along the border with Drenthe in order to exploit the peat. The canal was finished in 1856 and named Ter Apelkanaal. The settlement was named after the canal.

On 1902, construction started of a potato starch factory "Musselkanaal en Omstreken" in Ter Apelkanaal. The factory is nowadays owned by Royal Avebe.

Ter Apelkanaal used to be part of Vlagtwedde. In 2017, it was merged into Westerwolde.

References

Populated places in Groningen (province)
Westerwolde (municipality)